Calcium polonide (CaPo) is an intermetallic compound made up of calcium and polonium. Rather than being found in nature, the compound is entirely synthetic, and difficult to study, due to polonium's high vapor pressure, radioactivity, and easy oxidation in air.

Structure
At atmospheric pressure, it crystalizes in the cubic rock crystal salt structure. At a high pressure of around 16.7 GPa, the structure is predicted to transform to the caesium chloride-type crystal structure.

Electronic properties
Based on theoretical calculations, calcium polonide is predicted to be a semiconductor.

See also
 Magnesium polonide
 Potassium polonide

References

Polonides
Calcium compounds
Rock salt crystal structure